Holy Cross Priory is a Roman Catholic Dominican priory in Leicester, England.

History

The priory was established in 1882. By 1929, the church had proved too small and Friar Vincent McNabb O.P. began to raise money for a new church. The choir and transepts of the church was completed by 1931, and the High Altar was consecrated. The church was finally completed and formally consecrated in 1958.

The priory has had two church organs. The first were built by J Porritt & Son of Leicester in 1861. It was moved to the south side of the choir when the first part of the new church opened in 1931. The organ was, however, too small and difficult to play, and so a new organ was bought. The replacement came from St Mary's Church in Preston, Lancashire, and was built by William Ebenezer Richardson in 1880.

The friars preach in the village of Woodhouse, at the University of Leicester, De Montfort University and Leicester Royal Infirmary and teach at Blackfriars, Oxford.

References

External links

Official Holy Cross Priory Leicester website

Monasteries in Leicestershire
Dominican monasteries in England
Roman Catholic churches in Leicestershire
Holy Cross
Dominican churches in the United Kingdom
19th-century Roman Catholic church buildings in the United Kingdom